Randy Rogers Band is an American country music band from San Marcos, Texas. The band is composed of Randy Rogers (lead vocals), Geoffrey Hill (guitar), Jon Richardson (bass guitar), Brady Black (fiddle), Les Lawless (drums), and Todd Stewart (guitar, fiddle, mandolin, keyboards). They have recorded seven studio albums and two live albums, and have charted seven singles on the Billboard Hot Country Songs charts.

Biography
Randy Rogers was born in Cleburne, Texas. At the age of 6 years, he learned to play the piano from his grandmother, and later started playing the guitar.

The Randy Rogers Band recorded its debut album, Live at Cheatham Street Warehouse, at a music hall of the same name in San Marcos, Texas. By 2002, the band was signed to the independent Downtime record label, on which they released the album Like It Used to Be.  It was around this time that the band began performing outside of San Marcos, primarily at Nutty Brown Cafe and Amphitheatre in nearby Dripping Springs, Texas. Two years later, the album Rollercoaster was released, producing two minor entries on the Billboard Hot Country Songs charts in early 2005. Rogers also co-wrote "Somebody Take Me Home", a song recorded by Kenny Chesney, on his 2005 album, The Road and the Radio. Several of the songs on Rollercoaster were co-written by Radney Foster, who also co-produced the album. Just a Matter of Time, the band's first major-label album, was released on Mercury Nashville Records in 2006. The band also released their self-titled album on September 23, 2008, also on Mercury Nashville Records. The first single "In My Arms Instead", was released in August.

The band's fifth album, Burning the Day, was released on  August 24, 2010, on MCA Nashville. The album's first single was "Too Late for Goodbye." It debuted at 55 on the U.S. Billboard Hot Country Songs chart and after four weeks on the chart, it peaked at 47.

"One More Sad Song" was released in late 2012. The song became the band's first Billboard Top 40 hit, and the first single from their sixth album, Trouble.

Dreamer: A Tribute to Kent Finlay, released in 2016 on Austin-based Eight 30 Records, features Randy Rogers and Sunny Sweeney's duet "Between You and Me".

Pop Culture
Randy Rogers Band and their song “Speak of the Devil” referenced in Showtime TV series Billions (“STD” 21:04).

Discography

Studio albums

Live albums

Singles

Music videos

References

External links
Official website
Randy Rogers Band on Facebook

Country music groups from Texas
Musical groups from San Marcos, Texas
MCA Records artists
Mercury Records artists
Musical groups established in 2000
Thirty Tigers artists